Stromberg, Strömberg, Strømberg, Stroemberg, or variant may refer to:

Places

Germany
 Stromberg, Oelde, a town in Oelde
 Stromberg (landscape), a region in Baden-Württemberg
 Stromberg-Heuchelberg Nature Park
 Stromberg (Siebengebirge), a mountain peak now better known as Petersberg
 Stromberg (Verbandsgemeinde), a collective municipality in the district of Bad Kreuznach in Rheinland-Pfalz
 Stromberg (Hunsrück), a town and the seat of the collective municipality

People
 Stromberg (surname), people with the surname of any spelling variant

Corporate
 Stromberg, a carburetor brand name used by Zenith Carburetters and by Bendix Corporation
 Strömberg (company), a Finnish manufacturer of electronic products
 Stromberg Guitars, an American company producing guitars, mainly for jazz musicians, between 1906 and 1955
 Stromberg-Carlson, an American manufacturer of telephone equipment, radios and television
 Stromberg-Voisinet, manufacturer of musical instruments

Other uses
 Stromberg (TV series), a German television series
 Stromberg v. California, a 1931 United States Supreme Court case
 Strömberg wavelet in mathematics
 Karl Stromberg, the main antagonist in the 1977 James Bond film The Spy Who Loved Me

See also
Stein–Strömberg theorem in mathematics